Torodora capillaris is a moth in the family Lecithoceridae first described by Kyu-Tek Park and John B. Heppner in 2000. It is found in Taiwan.

The wingspan is 15.5–16 mm. Adults exhibit seasonal dimorphism. The summer form has pale orange forewings with brown scales scattered on the upper quarter of the costa. The costa is pale yellow anteriorly. There are two dark discal spots, one at the middle and a larger one at the end of the cell. The hindwings are grey. The spring form has pale greyish-orange forewings and four to five short dark brown streaks along the costa beyond two-thirds and five more along the termen. The hindwings are grey.

Etymology
The specific name is derived from Latin capillus (meaning hair) and refers to the hairy tufts arising from the ventral margin of the valve medially.

References

Moths described in 2000
Torodora